The 2018–19 Wichita State Shockers women's basketball team will represent Wichita State University in the 2018–19 NCAA Division I women's basketball season. They play their home games at Charles Koch Arena, which has a capacity of 10,506. The Shockers, led by second year head coach Keitha Adams, were second year members of the American Athletic Conference. They finished the season 12–18, 5–11 in AAC play to finish in a 4 way tie for ninth place. They lost in first round of the American Athletic women's tournament to Tulsa.

Roster

Schedule

|-
!colspan=9 style=| Exhibition

|-
!colspan=9 style=| Non-conference regular season

|-
!colspan=9 style=| AAC regular season

|-
!colspan=9 style=| AAC Women's Tournament

See also
2018–19 Wichita State Shockers men's basketball team

References

Wichita State Shockers women's basketball seasons
Wichita State